Neal Obermeyer (March 12, 1978) is an editorial cartoonist for the Lincoln Journal-Star, the San Diego Reader, and the Omaha Reader. He currently resides in Omaha, Nebraska, United States.

Early life
Obermeyer was born on March 12, 1978, in Auburn, Nebraska. He was raised on a farm around Auburn. During his time there he was very active in many extra-curricular activities, but most notably for Cross Country and Journalism. He graduated from Auburn High School as Valedictorian of the class of 1996.

It was during this time that he began his first cartoon serial, "The Adventures of Planarian Man," which was published in the Auburn Press-Tribune.

He later went on to the University of Nebraska-Lincoln. He continued some work with Planarian Man, but also became the editorial cartoonist for the Daily Nebraskan (the University of Nebraska's paper) and a disc jockey on KRNU (the University of Nebraska's radio station).

Career
Obermeyer has been an editorial cartoonist since 1999.1 He started at the Daily Nebraskan. After graduation he moved to San Diego and started cartooning for the San Diego Reader in January 2002.

In the summer of 2004, he began to work on the Lincoln Journal-Star, alternating with Paul Fell. In March 2006, he started a bi-weekly stint as cartoonist of the Omaha City Weekly. Out of this came a new job working for The Reader (newspaper) that started in October 2006 that continues today in addition to his jobs for the Lincoln Journal-Star and the San Diego Reader.

He also has contributed to HappyYoungPeople.com.

Slant
Though raised in Nebraska, which leans extremely right, many of his cartoons are made of people who repeat Republican or right-Wing jargon thoughtlessly. His favorite Journal-Star and Omaha Reader cartoon targets are local politicians.  He also likes to point out the hypocrisy of people of all leanings, sometimes using "Sneaky Donkey" to show the hypocrisy of the Republicans or "Stupid Donkey" to show the flaws of the Democrats. Many of his Journal-Star and Omaha Reader cartoons deal with local issues, such as the flawed thinking of some officials as they try to build business in Omaha, Lincoln, and State of Nebraska.

In the San Diego Reader, he tends to focus more on local government corruption and oddities.

Obermeyer also has a few trademarks:
 Former Lincoln mayor Coleen Seng is always in a flowered dress or a flowered top.
 Former councilman Ken Svoboda is always pictured as Magnum, P.I.
 The State Capital is always talking when representing the unicameral legislature's decision making.

Other interests
He also has dabbled in other projects. He has done editorial projects, such as "Neal Obermeyer Is All out of Bubblegum" with the "Switch" section3 of the Lincoln Journal-Star, which was closely linked to "Ground Zero", published by the Journal Star. He also did a series called "The Bearded Odyssey" with the Daily Nebraskan.

He likes to work with music and video. His biggest contribution in this area was working at KRNU and created the show, "You are so Beautiful, Beautiful Robot". Most of this show is dedicated to electronic music or electronic elements in music. Neal hosts this show through a Mac voice converter.

He has also made four documentaries with one in post-production. The subjects of these documentaries range from a man who lived in his van to Nebraska's version of bigfoot legends. Currently he is working on a documentary on real-life superheroes.

Notes
1 www.nealo.com 
2 www.nytimes.com 
3 www.cheeksofgod.com Neal's site 

1978 births
American editorial cartoonists
Living people
People from Auburn, Nebraska
Artists from Nebraska
University of Nebraska–Lincoln alumni